Jason Dean "J. D." Gibbs (February 21, 1969 – January 11, 2019) was an American professional stock car racing driver and co-owner of Joe Gibbs Racing. He also played college football at the College of William & Mary.

Early life and football career
J. D. Gibbs was born on February 21, 1969, near Los Angeles, California. At the time his father, Joe Gibbs, was the assistant coach at the University of Southern California. His mother is the former Patricia Escobar. During Gibbs' childhood, he moved several times before settling in Washington, D.C. Once he graduated from Oakton High School, he attended the College of William & Mary in Williamsburg, Virginia. While attending, he was the defensive back and quarterback during the 1987–1990 seasons, as his father coached for the Washington Redskins. He helped the school team to two Division I Football Championship Subdivision (formerly Division I-AA) playoff appearances; the team won ten games in his senior season.

Racing career
After school, he became employed with Joe Gibbs Racing, a team his father started in July 1991. The team, with only six employees, started racing with Dale Jarrett as the driver in 1992. In 1993, Gibbs was a tire changer on the team and was part of the 1993 Daytona 500 winning team. In the mid-1990s, J. D. started racing in the NASCAR Camping World East Series, as well as late-model events in North Carolina. Afterward, he started racing in the Craftsman Truck Series and Busch Series. In 1998, Gibbs became president of his father's team. After being the president for six years, his father returned to the Redskins after a 12-year hiatus. In 2007, he was rejoined with his father, once he retired for the second time.

Personal life and death
J. D. Gibbs was a resident of Davidson, North Carolina. He was married to his wife Melissa (née Miller), and had four sons, Joe Jackson, William Miller, Jason Dean II, and Zachary Taylor.

Gibbs was a major contributor and former member of Young Life, a non-denominational Christian organization for adolescents.

In May 2015, it was announced that Gibbs was battling "conditions related to brain function". During the ensuing years, his public appearances and involvement in the team became less frequent as the symptoms slowly began to show. He died at his home on January 11, 2019.

A memorial service was held at Davidson College's John M. Belk Arena on January 25, 2019, where he was eulogized by his wife Melissa, his father, his brother Coy, and his best friends Dave Alpern and Moose Valliere.

Motorsports career results

NASCAR
(key) (Bold – Pole position awarded by qualifying time. Italics – Pole position earned by points standings or practice time. * – Most laps led.)

Busch Series

Craftsman Truck Series

References

External links
 

1969 births
2019 deaths
NASCAR drivers
NASCAR team owners
People from Davidson, North Carolina
Racing drivers from Los Angeles
Racing drivers from North Carolina
Players of American football from Los Angeles
William & Mary Tribe football players
Oakton High School alumni
Joe Gibbs Racing drivers
Neurological disease deaths in North Carolina